Boscia albitrunca, commonly known as the shepherd tree or shepherd's tree, is a protected species of South African tree in the caper family. The species epithet "albitrunca" refers to the oftentimes white trunk it develops. Traditionally, the shepherd tree was used by Dutch settlers, boers, to create a variant of coffee from the roots of the tree. It is an evergreen tree native to southern and tropical Africa, living in the hot, dry, and often seasonally brackish low-lying areas, sometimes on abundant lime or occasionally on rocky terrain. It is a common tree of the Kalahari, bushveld and lowveld. It is one of the most important animal forage trees in the Kalahari.

Description
It has a prominent, sturdy white trunk frequently with strips of rough, dark-coloured bark. The crown is often browsed by antelope and any grazers capable of reaching the foliage, resulting in a conspicuous flattened underside, or browse-line. The leaves are narrow, oblanceolate, and stiff, with veins obscure except for the distinct midrib. The flowers are small, greenish-yellow, lacking petals, starburst-shaped, and clustered.

Relationships
Boscia belongs to the caper family, Capparaceae. Boscia albitrunca is closely related to  Boscia foetida subsp. rehmanniana, the bushveld shepherd's tree, which has much smaller leaves and velvet-textured skin on its fruits. The genus was named for Louis Bosc (1759–1828), a French professor of agriculture who lived through the French Revolution.

Gallery

References

External links
 

albitrunca
Flora of Mozambique
Flora of Zambia
Protected trees of South Africa